Lanthanum strontium cobalt ferrite (LSCF), also called lanthanum strontium cobaltite ferrite is a specific ceramic oxide derived from lanthanum cobaltite of the ferrite group. It is a phase containing lanthanum(III) oxide, strontium oxide, cobalt oxide and iron oxide with the formula , where 0.1≤x≤0.4 and 0.2≤y≤0.8.

It is black in color and crystallizes in a distorted hexagonal perovskite structure. LSCF undergoes phase transformations at various temperatures depending on the composition. This material is a mixed ionic electronic conductor with comparatively high electronic conductivity (200+ S/cm) and good ionic conductivity (0.2 S/cm). It is typically non-stoichiometric and can be reduced further at high temperature in low oxygen partial pressures or in the presence of a reducing agent such as carbon.

LSCF is being investigated as a material for intermediate temperature solid oxide fuel cell cathodes and, potentially as a direct carbon fuel cell anode.

LSCF is also investigated as a membrane material for separation of oxygen from air, for use in e.g. cleaner burning power plants.

See also
 Lanthanum strontium manganite (LSM)
 Lanthanum strontium ferrite (LSF)
 Lanthanum calcium manganite (LCM)
 Lanthanum strontium chromite (LSC)
 Lanthanum strontium gallate magnesite (LSGM)

References

External links
 LSCF supplier and info American Elements

Ceramic materials
Fuel cells
Lanthanum compounds
Strontium compounds
Cobalt compounds
Oxides
Non-stoichiometric compounds
Ferrites